Pyeongchang station is a railway station in Yongpyeong-myeon, Pyeongchang, South Korea. It is served by the Gangneung Line. The station opened on 22 December 2017, ahead of the 2018 Winter Olympics.

Features 
The station name is Pyeongchang, but it is more than 20 km away from Pyeongchang-eup, and there is a station between Yeongdong Expressway Pyeongchang Crossroad and Seoul National University Pyeongchang campus.

Platform 
This station has 2 platforms and 4 tracks.

Footnotes 

 ↑ Minis (平昌驛) the try of Land, Transport and Communications Notice 2017-428, June 29, 2017.

References

External links
 

Buildings and structures in Pyeongchang County
Railway stations in Gangwon Province, South Korea
Railway stations opened in 2017